Ecuador competed at the 2022 Winter Olympics in Beijing, China, from 4 to 20 February 2022.

Ecuador's team consisted of one female athlete competing in alpine skiing. As the country's only athlete, Sarah Escobar was the nation's flagbearer during the opening ceremony. Meanwhile a volunteer was the flagbearer during the closing ceremony.

Competitors
The following is the list of number of competitors that participated at the Games per sport/discipline.

Alpine skiing

By meeting the basic qualification standards, Ecuador qualified one female alpine skier. Sarah Escobar is a first generation American skier who decided to compete for her parents' birth country of Ecuador. This was the second time Escobar represented Ecuador on the Olympic stage, as she skied at the 2020 Winter Youth Olympics in Lausanne, Switzerland.

See also
Tropical nations at the Winter Olympics
Ecuador at the 2020 Winter Youth Olympics

References

Nations at the 2022 Winter Olympics
2022
2022 in Ecuadorian sport